The Federal College of Education, Eha-Amufu is a federal government higher education institution located in Eha Amufu, Enugu State, Nigeria. It is affiliated to University of Nigeria for its degree programmes. The current Provost is Pauline Ikwuegbu.

History 
The Federal College of Education, Eha-Amufu was established in 1981.

The College was established on February 21, 1981 by the then Governor of the old Anambra state, Chief. Jim Ifeanyichukwu Nwobodo. On December 23, 1982, the then Anambra State House of Assembly enacted a law retroactively establishing the College. The law was cited as Anambra State of Nigeria Law No. 28 of 1982 which came into force on February 21, 1981.  The site was formerly occupied by the Federal Government owned Teacher Training College (TTC), Eha-Amufu.

After the announcement of the establishment of the College of Education Eha-Amufu by the Governor with effect from February 21 1981, a temporary office with skeletal staff was opened around the then Anambra Television (ATV), Independence Layout, Enugu. On August 7, 1981, the then Anambra State Commissioner for Education and the then Permanent Secretary to the Ministry took the newly appointed Provost and Registrar to the present site of the College at Eha-Amufu about 64km north-east of the coal city, the Enugu State capital.  The initial enrolment of 196 students were admitted in 1981 and staff strength of 147 made up of 23 Academic staff, 15 Senior Administrative staff and 109 junior staff. The maiden graduation ceremony was held in 1984.The staff strength as at 1981 – 1994 includes academic staff 89, administrative 8, technical 58, junior 231, totaling 378.  Between 1991–1994, the total staff strength had reached 588 which was the result of expansion in all aspects of the College including infrastructure. 

Following the creation of state in 1991, the then Enugu State Government inherited the College from the former Anambra State Government. The College functioned as a state institution until the Federal Government took it over in April, 1993 with financial effect from January, 1994.  The Decree No. 4 of 1986 as amended by Decree No. 34 of 1993 and Decree No. 6 of 1993 established the Federal College of Education, Eha-Amufu among 19 other Colleges.  These Laws provided therefore all the structures established under the 1982 Anambra State Legislation.

The Federal College of Education, Eha-Amufu is the 20th Federal College of Education in the Federal Colleges of Education system in Nigeria.

Courses 
The institution offers the following courses;

 Economics
 French
 Igbo
 Hausa
 Music
 Integrated Science
 Political Science
 History
 Social Studies
 English
 Yoruba
 Christian Religious Studies
 Computer Education
 Physical and Health Education
 Fine and Applied Arts 
 Mathematics
 Business Education
 Agricultural Science Education
 Primary Education Studies 
 Home Economics

Affiliation 
The institution is affiliated with the University of Nigeria to offer programmes leading to Bachelor of Education, (B.Ed.) in;

 English Language Education
 Mathematics Education
 Chemistry Education
 Economics Education
 History Education
 Social Studies Education
 Christian Religion Education
 Integrated Education
 Physics Education
 Agric Education
 Biology Education
 Business Education

References

Federal colleges of education in Nigeria
1981 establishments in Nigeria
Educational institutions established in 1981
Buildings and structures in Enugu State